Live at Vielharmonie is a live album by American jazz drummer Max Roach recorded in 1983 in Munich for the Italian Soul Note label.

Reception
The Allmusic review awarded the album 2½ stars.

Track listing
All compositions by Max Roach except as indicated
 "A Little Booker" - 20:28 
 "Bird Says" (Cecil Bridgewater) - 18:03 
Recorded at the Vielharmonie in Munich, West Germany on November 7, 1983

Personnel
Max Roach - drums, percussion
Cecil Bridgewater - trumpet
Dayne Armstrong - tenor saxophone
Lars Holm, Ulrika Jansson - violin
Anders Lindgren - viola
Kerstin Elmquist - cello
Phil Bowler - electric bass

References

Black Saint/Soul Note live albums
Max Roach live albums
1983 live albums